The Bride Comes Home is a 1935 comedy film made by Paramount Pictures, directed by Wesley Ruggles, and starring Claudette Colbert, Fred MacMurray and Robert Young. It was written by Claude Binyon and Elisabeth Sanxay Holding.

Plot
After the bankruptcy of her father's business, the penniless socialite Jeannette Desmereau (Colbert) works with magazine editor Cyrus Anderson (MacMurray) and publisher Jack Bristow (Young). They discuss love and wedding plans. However, when Bristow would seem to marry her, Anderson prepares a plan to take her back. This is a romantic comedy with money, bad tempers and love in the balance.

Cast
Claudette Colbert as Jeannette Desmereau
Fred MacMurray as Cyrus Anderson
Robert Young as Jack Bristow
William Collier, Sr. as Alfred Desmereau
Donald Meek as The judge
Richard Carle as Frank (butler)
Edgar Kennedy as Henry
Johnny Arthur as Otto
Kate MacKenna as Emma
Jimmy Conlin as Len Noble
Edward Gargan as Cab driver

Critical reception
Writing for The Spectator in 1936, Graham Greene strongly praised the film as "satirical comedy of a very high order". Emphasizing the performance given by Claudette Colbert, Greene suggested that Colbert's having been given a third role in film (following It Happened One Night and She Married Her Boss) made fact of the claim that "Miss Colbert is the most charming light-comedy actress on the screen".

References

External links
 
 
 
 The Bride Comes Home at Virtual History

1935 films
American black-and-white films
Paramount Pictures films
Films directed by Wesley Ruggles
1935 romantic comedy films
American romantic comedy films
1930s American films